Pachydactylus barnardi, also known commonly as Barnard's rough gecko or Barnard's thick-toed gecko, is a species of lizard in the family Gekkonidae. The species is indigenous to Southern Africa.

Etymology
The specific name, barnardi, is in honor of South African zoologist Keppel Harcourt Barnard.

Geographic range
P. barnardi is found in Namibia and South Africa (Cape Province and southern Little Namaqualand).

Habitat
The preferred natural habitat of P. barnardi is shrubland.

Description
On its back, P. barnardi has rows of enlarged tubercles, separated by small granular scales.

Reproduction
P. barnardi is oviparous.

References

Further reading
Lamb T, Bauer AM (2000). "Relationships of the Pachydactylus rugosus group of geckos (Reptilia: Squamata: Gekkonidae)". African Zoology 35 (1): 55–67. (Pachydactylus barnardi, new status).
FitzSimons VFM (1941). "Descriptions of some new Lizards from South Africa and a Frog from Southern Rhodesia". Annals of the Transvaal Museum 20 (3): 273–281. (Pachydactylus capensis barnardi, new subspecies, p. 273).
Mashinini PL, Mahlangu LM (2013). "An annotated catalogue of the types of gekkonid lizards (Reptilia: Squamata: Gekkonidae) in the Herpetology collection of the Ditsong National Museum of Natural History, South Africa". Annals of the Ditsong National Museum of Natural History 3: 165–181.

Pachydactylus
Reptiles described in 1941
Reptiles of South Africa
Reptiles of Namibia
Taxa named by Vivian Frederick Maynard FitzSimons